Capo Vaticano Lighthouse is an active lighthouse located in Capo Vaticano, which is a Cape in the south western Calabria on the Tyrrhenian Sea.

Description
The lighthouse is fully automated and is operated by the Marina Militare and is identified by the code number 2708 E.F.

See also
 List of lighthouses in Italy
 Capo Vaticano

References

External links

 Servizio Fari Marina Militare 

Lighthouses in Italy